Sengbe Pieh (18141879), also known as Joseph Cinqué or Cinquez and sometimes referred to mononymously as Cinqué, was a West African man of the Mende people who led a revolt of many Africans on the Spanish slave ship La Amistad in July 1839. After the ship was taken into custody by the United States Revenue Cutter Service, Cinqué and his fellow Africans were eventually tried for mutiny and killing officers on the ship, in a case known as United States v. The Amistad. This reached the U.S. Supreme Court, where Cinqué and his fellow Africans were found to have rightfully defended themselves from being enslaved through the illegal Atlantic slave trade and were released. The US government did not provide any aid to the acquitted Mende People. The United Missionary Society, a black group founded by James W.C. Pennington, helped raise money for the return of thirty-five of the survivors to Sierra Leone in 1842.

Biography
Cinqué was born 1814 in what is now Sierra Leone. His exact date of birth remains unknown. He was a rice farmer, and married with three children, when he was sold into slavery to redeem a debt. He was bought by the Vai king Siaka and in 1839 sold to Pedro Blanco, a Spanish slave trader. He was imprisoned on the Portuguese slave ship Tecora, in violation of treaties prohibiting the international slave trade. Cinqué was taken to Havana, Cuba, where he was sold with 110 others to Spaniards José Ruiz and Pedro Montez.

The Spaniards arranged to transport the captives on the coastal schooner Amistad, with the intention of selling them as slaves at ports along the coast of Cuba for work on sugar plantations. On June 30, Cinqué led a revolt, killing the captain and the cook of the ship; two slaves also died, and two sailors escaped. The Africans took Ruiz and Montez, the merchants who had purchased them, as prisoners and demanded that they direct the ship back to Sierra Leone. Instead, at night, they directed the navigator in the opposite direction, toward the Americas, in the hope of attracting the attention of one of their fellow Spaniards who would save their ship and regain control. The ship had an uneven course between the coasts of the United States and Africa. After about two months, Amistad reached United States waters near Long Island, New York. Members of the USS Washington boarded the vessel. When they discovered what had happened (according to the Spaniards), they charged the Africans with mutiny and murder. The ship and the Mende were taken to New Haven, Connecticut, to await trial.

The two Spaniards claimed that the Africans had been born in Cuba and were already slaves at the time of their purchase, and were therefore legal property. Interpreters from Mende to English were found, who enabled the Africans to tell their story to attorneys and the court. Cinqué served as the group's informal representative.

After the case was ruled in favor of the Africans in the district and circuit courts, the case was appealed by the Spanish parties, including its government, to the Supreme Court of the United States. In March 1841, the Supreme Court ruled that the Africans mutinied to regain their freedom after being kidnapped and sold illegally. The advocacy of former U.S. President John Quincy Adams, together with Roger Sherman Baldwin, was critical to the Africans' defense. The court ordered the Africans freed and returned to Africa, if they wished. This decision was against the protests of President Martin Van Buren, who worried about relations with Spain and implications for domestic slavery.

Cinqué and the other Mende reached their homeland in 1842. In Sierra Leone, Cinqué encountered civil war.  He and his company maintained contact with the local mission for a while, but Cinqué left to trade along the coast. Little is known of his later life, and rumors circulated. Some maintained that he had moved to Jamaica. Others held that he had become a merchant or a chief, perhaps trading in slaves himself.

The latter charge derived from oral accounts from Africa cited by the twentieth-century author William A. Owens, who claimed that he had seen letters from AMA missionaries suggesting Cinqué was a slave trader. More recently historians such as Howard Jones in 2000 and Joseph Yannielli in 2009 have argued that, although some of the Africans associated with the Amistad probably did engage in the slave trade upon their return, given the nature of the regional economy at the time, the allegations of Cinqué's involvement seem implausible in view of the lack of evidence, and the unlikelihood of a conspiracy of silence leaving no traces.

Samuel Pieh, a great-great-grandson of Sengbe Pieh and language coach for the 1997 Amistad film, stated that Cinqué would go on to  become a key figure in Sierra Leone, as well as helping to Christianize the country.

In popular culture 
In Amistad, the 1997 film depicting the events of the mutiny and trial, Cinqué was portrayed by the Beninese-American actor Djimon Hounsou.
Cinqué and the Amistad are memorialized in New Haven by a statue of Cinqué outside City Hall.
A golden sculpture of Cinqué is located outside the Old State House in Hartford, Connecticut, where the first part of the Amistad trial was held.
A sculpture of Cinqué in various points throughout the Amistad affair stands outside City Hall in New Haven, on the former site of the prison in which he and the other Amistad captives were held.
Robert Hayden's poem Middle Passage incorporates accounts of the revolt on the Amistad and the subsequent trial.
The likeness of Sengbe Pieh appears on Sierra Leone's 5000 leone banknote.
American composer Anthony Davis wrote an opera, Amistad (1997), based on these events. It premiered at the Lyric Opera of Chicago.
J. Ivy references Cinqué in his feature on the Kanye West song "Never Let Me Down."

See also 

Amistad (case), about the rebellion and the Supreme Court case United States v. The Amistad.
Amistad (film), a movie about the court case.
Amistad (ship replica), a replica of the ship.
Amistad Research Center at Tulane University, New Orleans
List of slaves

References

External links 
 Online Biography
 Fan the Flame by Leonard Tim Hector
 "The Amistad Case" from the Smithsonian
 The Amistad Revolt by Arthur Abraham
 

1810s births
1879 deaths
Cuban slaves
History of Sierra Leone
Slavery in the United States
Rebel slaves
La Amistad
Mende people
19th-century Sierra Leonean people
Burials in Sierra Leone
19th-century slaves
19th-century rebels
African slaves